
Gmina Komarówka Podlaska is a rural gmina (administrative district) in Radzyń Podlaski County, Lublin Voivodeship, in eastern Poland.

Villages
Gmina Komarówka Podlaska contains the villages and settlements of Brzeziny, Brzozowy Kąt, Derewiczna, Kolembrody, Komarówka Podlaska, Przegaliny Duże, Przegaliny Małe, Walinna, Wiski, Wólka Komarowska, Woroniec, Żelizna and Żulinki.

Neighbouring gminas
Gmina Komarówka Podlaska is bordered by the gminas of Drelów, Łomazy, Milanów, Rossosz, Wisznice and Wohyń.

References
Polish official population figures 2006

Komarowka Podlaska
Radzyń Podlaski County